Årland is a village in Samnanger municipality in Vestland county, Norway.  The village is located on the northeastern shore of the Samnangerfjorden, west of the village of Haga.  It sits along Norwegian County Road 7, which runs from the city of Bergen to Samnanger. Samnanger Church is located in this village. The newspaper Samningen has been published in Årland since 1977.

References

Villages in Vestland
Samnanger